George Herbert Perris (1866–1920) was the originator of the Home University Library of Modern Knowledge, a series of popular non-fiction books from the first half of the twentieth century that ran to over 200 volumes.

Selected publications
Blood and Gold in South Africa: An Answer to Dr. Conan Doyle: Being an examination of his account of the "Causes and Conduct" of the South-African War, International Arbitration Association, London, 1902.
The Protectionist Peril: An Examination of Mr. Chamberlain's Proposals, Methuen, London, 1903.
Russia in Revolution, Chapman & Hall, London, 1905.
Germany and the German Emperor, Andrew Melrose, London, 1912.
The War Traders: An Exposure, National Peace Council, London, 1914.
The campaign of 1914 in France and Belgium, Hodder & Stoughton, London, 1915.
A Short History of War and Peace
The Battle of the Marne, Methuen, London, 1920.
The Industrial History of Modern England, London, Kegan Paul, Trench, Trubner & Co., 1920.

References

Further reading
Gomme, Robert. (2003) George Herbert Perris 1866-1920: The Life and Times of a Radical. Peter Lang Publishing.

External links 

http://archiveshub.ac.uk/data/gb96-ms924/180-218
http://onlinebooks.library.upenn.edu/webbin/book/lookupname?key=Perris%2C%20G.%20H.%20%28George%20Herbert%29%2C%201866-1920
 

1866 births
1920 deaths
British publishers (people)
British journalists